Vice-Admiral The Hon. Sir Montagu Stopford KCB (11 November 1798 – 10 November 1864) was an officer in the Royal Navy.

Naval career 
The fifth and youngest son of James Stopford, 3rd Earl of Courtown, and his wife, the former Lady Mary Scott, he entered the Navy on 8 November 1810 and was commissioned as lieutenant on 17 July 1819 and as commander on 29 January 1822.

Also during that time, on 25 August 1827, he married Cordelia Winifreda, the second daughter of Major-General Sir George Whitmore – they had four children, including Major George Montagu Stopford. His wife died after 24 years of marriage.   She died on 4 September 1851.

He was captain in the Waterloo again from 1 April 1852, this time during her service as Vice-Admiral Josceline Percy's flagship. He left that role on 5 December 1853 on being promoted to rear admiral, becoming the admiral superintendent of Malta Dockyard in 1855, flying his flag in HMS Ceylon. He also remarried, to Lucy Cay, daughter of John Cay, on 29 September 1853, and the couple had three more children (one of whom was Colonel Sir Lionel Stopford). He became a Knight Commander of the Bath on 5 July 1855, and was promoted to vice-admiral on 25 June 1858, and finally admiral on 30 November 1863.  He had retired by 9 February 1864.

See also

References 

1798 births
1864 deaths
Royal Navy admirals
Knights Commander of the Order of the Bath
Younger sons of earls
Montagu
Royal Navy personnel of the Crimean War